My Hero 2 (一本漫畫闖天涯2之妙想天開) is a 1993 Hong Kong comedy film directed by Joe Chu, starring Dicky Cheung and Ng Man Tat. Despite the title, it is not a sequel to the movie "My Hero (1990)", starring Stephen Chow.

Synopsis
The movie is about Cheung Kin-Hong's (Dicky Cheung) ploy to get a good story involving triads for his comics. He is a comics artist and writer who has not been very successful in the past. Then one day he encounters his hero, Brother Tat (Ng Man-Tat) at his regular cafe. He manages to convince Tat, who happens to be also involved with the triads, to help him get the information he needed for his comics. How did it turn out? Did it help him to succeed?

Cast

External links
 
 My Hero 2 (1993) at HKCinemagic
 

1990s Cantonese-language films
1993 comedy films
1993 films
Hong Kong comedy films
1990s Hong Kong films